The 2018 Artistic Gymnastics World Championships was the 48th edition of the Artistic Gymnastics World Championships. The competition was held from October 25 – November 3, 2018, at the Aspire Academy Dome in Doha, Qatar.

It was the first time that the competition was held in the Middle East.

Simone Biles became the first American to medal on every event at a single World Championships and the first woman to do so in 31 years. The last person to complete this feat was Russian Yelena Shushunova in 1987.

Competition schedule

Medal summary

Medalists 
Names with an asterisk (*) denote the team alternate.

Medal standings

Overall

Men

Women

Men's results

Team 
The top 3 teams from the 2018 World Artistic Gymnastics Championships qualified to the 2020 Summer Olympic Games.

Oldest and youngest competitors

Individual all-around 
Defending champion Xiao Ruoteng of China lost the title on a tiebreaker to Russia's Artur Dalaloyan. The tie-breaking procedure in this situation is dropping of the lowest-scoring apparatus from the combined score, and whoever's total score on the remaining five apparatuses is higher after that will rank ahead (74.198 versus 73.465). Dalaloyan became the first Russian man to win the all-around title since Nikolai Kryukov in 1999; they were at that time the only two Russian men to have won the title in the post-Soviet era. Last year's silver medalist, China's Lin Chaopan, failed to reach the final after finishing behind teammates Xiao and Sun Wei in qualifying. Reigning bronze medalist Kenzō Shirai of Japan finished in seventh place after some weaker and lower-scoring apparatuses, namely pommel horse.

Canada's René Cournoyer withdrew prior to the competition and was replaced by first reserve Artur Davtyan of Armenia.

Oldest and youngest competitors

Floor 
Oldest and youngest competitors

Pommel horse 
Oldest and youngest competitors

Rings 
Oldest and youngest competitors

Vault 
Oldest and youngest competitors

Parallel bars 
Oldest and youngest competitors

Horizontal bar 
Oldest and youngest competitors

Women's results

Team 
The top 3 teams from the 2018 World Artistic Gymnastics Championships qualify to the 2020 Summer Olympic Games.

Oldest and youngest competitors

Individual all-around 
Simone Biles of the United States won an unprecedented fourth all-around title on the women's side. Teammate and defending champion Morgan Hurd placed third. Japan's Mai Murakami recorded her country's highest-ever finish in the all-around, and her silver was Japan's first all-around medal on the women's side since Kōko Tsurumi's bronze in 2009. Reigning silver medalist Ellie Black of Canada finished twelfth. The 2017 bronze medalist, Russia's Elena Eremina, was unable to compete due to a back injury. This final was one of the most closely contested of all time, with less than two tenths of a point separating the second- to sixth-place gymnasts.

Oldest and youngest competitors

Vault 
Oldest and youngest competitors

Uneven bars 
Oldest and youngest competitors

Balance beam 
Oldest and youngest competitors

Floor 
Oldest and youngest competitors

Qualification

Men's results

Team

Individual all-around

Floor 

Although Artur Dalaloyan of Russia and Kenzō Shirai of Japan both posted the top combined score (14.833) in qualifications, Dalaloyan placed ahead after applying the tie-breaking procedure because he posted a higher E-score than Shirai (8.633 versus 8.033). The same situation with the score (14.333) happened for Kazuma Kaya of Japan, Sam Mikulak of the United States and James Hall of Britain, when Kaya and Mikulak took the final's last two spots after their tied 8th place because they posted identical D- and E-scores while Hall ended up placing 10th, and just missed qualifying for the finals, even though he posted the same combined score.

Pommel horse

Rings

Vault

Parallel bars

Horizontal bar

Women's results

Team

Individual all-around

Vault

Uneven bars

Balance beam

Floor

References 

World Artistic Gymnastics Championships
Gymnastics competitions in Qatar
International sports competitions hosted by Qatar
International gymnastics competitions hosted by Qatar
Sports competitions in Doha
Artistic
World Artistic Gymnastics Championships
World Artistic Gymnastics Championships
World Artistic Gymnastics Championships